Thigambara Samiar is 1950 Indian Tamil-language thriller film produced and directed by T. R. Sundaram. An adaptation of Vaduvoor K. Duraswamy Iyengar's novel of the same name, the film stars M. N. Nambiar and M. S. Draupadi. It revolves around the efforts of a man to expose the illicit activities of a corrupt lawyer. The film was released on 22 September 1950, and emerged a commercial success.

Plot 

The film revolves around the efforts of Chokkalingam Pillai (Thigambara Samiar) to expose the illicit activities of S. S. Sattanathan Pillai, a corrupt lawyer.

Cast 

Male cast
 M. N. Nambiar as Chokkalingam Pillai
 Narasimhabharathi as Kannappa
 D. Balasubramaniam as S. S. Sattanathan Pillai
 M. G. Chakrapani as Pattabhi Raman
 Azhwar Kuppusami as Sundaram Pillai
 V. M. Ezhumalai as Bandyman
 Karunanidhi as Manickam
 T. K. Ramachandran as Masilamani
 V. K. Ramsamy as Velayudha Pillai
 S. S. Sivasoorian as Namasivayam Pillai
 M. A. Ganapathi as Sanda Marutham
 Srinivasa Gopalan as Chandra's grandfather
 Thirupathi, Mani, Subbaiah

Female cast
 M. S. Draupadi as Vadivambal
 Lakshmiprabha as Alangaram
 C. K. Saraswathi as Anjalai
 K. T. Dhanalakshmi as Chandra's mother
 K. Jayalakshmi as Alangaram's mother
 Baby Lalitha as Chandra
 Kamalam, Kannamma, Saraswathi
Dance
 Lalitha-Padmini
 Kumari Kamala

Production 
Thigambara Samiar, an adaptation of the novel of the same name by Vaduvoor K. Duraswamy Iyengar, was directed by T. R. Sundaram who also produced it under Modern Theatres. It was a rare heroic role for M. N. Nambiar, who was generally known for negative roles. The scenario was written by Ko. Tha. Shanmuga. Cinematography was handled by G. R. Nathan and T. S. Kotnis, and editing by L. Balu. Choreography of the dances was done by Vazhuvoor B. Ramiah Pillai, Madhavan and R. T. Krishnamoorthi

Themes 
According to historian Randor Guy, the film re-uses a theory from the novel, "that if a man is made to stay awake without sleep for three or four days, he will be in a mood to confess everything hidden in his mind".

Soundtrack 
The music was composed by G. Ramanathan and S. M. Subbaiah Naidu and the lyrics were written by Ka. Mu. Sheriff, A. Maruthakasi, K. B. Kamakshisundaram, Kannadasan and Thanjai N. Ramaiah Dass. "Oosi Pattasey Oosi Pattasey" is based on "O Dilwalo Dil Ka Lagana Acha Hai" from the Hindi film Patanga (1949) and "Paarudappa Paarudappa Paarudapppa" is based on "Lara Lappa Lara Lappa" from Ek Thi Larki, another 1949 Hindi film.

Release and reception 
Thigambara Samiar was released on 22 September 1950, and emerged a commercial success.

References

External links 
 

1950 films
1950s Tamil-language films
1950s thriller films
Films about women in India
Films based on Indian novels
Films directed by T. R. Sundaram
Films scored by G. Ramanathan
Films scored by S. M. Subbaiah Naidu
Indian black-and-white films
Indian thriller films